Difluoroacetic acid is a chemical compound with formula CHF2COOH. It is a dihalogenocarboxylic acid, specifically a structural analog of acetic acid with two of three hydrogen atoms on the alpha carbon replaced with fluorine atoms. In solution, it dissociates to form difluoroacetate ions. Difluoroacetic acid can also be used as direct C-H difluoromethylating reagent.

See also
 Fluoroacetic acid
 Trifluoroacetic acid

References

Fluorinated carboxylic acids
Difluoromethyl compounds